Geoff Lawson may refer to:

Geoff Lawson (cricketer) (born 1957), Australian cricketer
Geoff Lawson (designer) (1944–1999), British car designer

See also
Jeff Lawson (disambiguation)